Bdellonyssus is a genus of mites in the family Dermanyssidae. There are at least two described species in Bdellonyssus.

Species
These two species belong to the genus Bdellonyssus:
 Bdellonyssus bursa (Berlese, 1888)
 Bdellonyssus venezolanus Vitzthum, 1931

References

Mesostigmata
Articles created by Qbugbot